Desmodium is a large genus of plants in the pea family, Fabaceae (tribe Desmodieae). This is a list of species in the Genus Desmodium from Kew's Plants of the World Online database  and other sources:

Moved species
 Desmodium velutinum (Willd.) DC. has been now moved to a separate monotypic genus Polhillides velutina .

References

 
Desmodium